Sierra de Cubitas is a municipality in the Camagüey Province of Cuba. The municipal seat is located in the town of Cubitas.

Geography
The municipality borders with Esmeralda, Camagüey and Minas. Its territory includes the towns of Cubitas (seat) and Sola (largest settlement), and the villages of Cubita Madura, El Colorado, Imías, La Gloria, Paso de Lesca, Playa Piloto, Saimí and Vilató. Cayo Guajaba, one of the cays of Jardines del Rey archipelago, is located north of Cubitas, across the Bay of la Gloria (Bahia de la Gloria).

Demographics
In 2004, the municipality of Sierra de Cubitas had a population of 18,589.

See also
Sierra de Cubitas Municipal Museum
List of cities in Cuba
Municipalities of Cuba

References

External links

Populated places in Camagüey Province